Platythyrea is a genus of predaceous ants in the subfamily Ponerinae and the sole member of the tribe Platythyreini.

Distribution
The genus has a worldwide distribution, and is found in the tropics and subtropics of the world.

Description
Workers are small to very large in size (4–20 mm). Gamergates (reproductive female workers) are known from all studied species except one, P. conradti, which have ergatoid queens (wingless reproductive ants, intermediate in form between workers and winged queens). Some species with gamergates also have alate queens, which are similar to the workers but winged.

Parthenogenesis
Parthenogenesis is a natural form of reproduction in which growth and development of embryos occur without fertilisation. Thelytoky is a particular form of parthenogenesis in which the development of a female individual occurs from an unfertilized egg.  Automixis is a form of thelytoky, but there are different kinds of automixis.  The kind of automixis relevant here is one in which two haploid products from the same meiosis combine to form a diploid zygote (see diagram).

Colonies of  Platythyrea punctata from Florida and the Caribbean Islands produce offspring almost exclusively by automictic thelytoky. Automixis appears to involve central fusion of two of the haploid products of meiosis (see diagram).  This form of automixis tends to maintain heterozygosity in transmission of the genome from mother to offspring, and to minimize inbreeding depression.  Furthermore, crossover recombination occurs at a greatly reduced rate during meiosis, which likely restrains the transition from heterozygosity to homozygosity.

Species

References

External links

Ponerinae
Ant genera